Babino Polje  is a village in Dalmatia, southern Croatia. With a population of 270, it is the largest settlement on the island of Mljet and it is connected by the D120 state road.

Gallery

References

Populated places in Dubrovnik-Neretva County
Mljet